Émile Grumiaux (11 June 1861 in Boussu – 18 May 1932 in Liévin) was a French competitor in the sport of archery.  Grumiaux competed in one event, winning the Sur la Perche à la Pyramide competition. He is now considered by the International Olympic Committee to have won a gold medal.  No scores are known from that competition.

See also
 Archery at the 1900 Summer Olympics

Notes
  - Prizes at the time were silver medals for first place and bronze medals for second, as well as usually including cash awards.  The current gold, silver, bronze medal system was initiated at the 1904 Summer Olympics.  The International Olympic Committee has retroactively assigned medals in the current system to top three placers at early Olympics.

References

Sources
 International Olympic Committee medal winners database

External links
 

1861 births
1932 deaths
Archers at the 1900 Summer Olympics
Olympic archers of France
French male archers
Olympic gold medalists for France
Olympic medalists in archery
Medalists at the 1900 Summer Olympics